The Last O.G. is an American comedy television series created by Jordan Peele and John Carcieri that premiered on March 31, 2018 on TBS. The series follows a convict released after serving fifteen years who returns to Brooklyn to find his old neighborhood has changed, and his ex-girlfriend is raising their children with another man. It stars Tracy Morgan, Tiffany Haddish, Allen Maldonado, Ryan Gaul, Taylor Christian Mosby, Dante Hoagland, and Cedric the Entertainer. In October 2020, the series was renewed for a fourth season which premiered on October 26, 2021 and concluded on December 21, 2021. In April 2022, it was revealed that the fourth season was the final season, the final episode having aired on December 21, 2021.

Premise
Tray is an ex-con who is released from prison for good behavior after serving fifteen years. He returns to his old Brooklyn neighborhood to find that it has become gentrified. His ex-girlfriend, Shannon (also known by nickname Shay-Shay), is now married to another man named Josh and is raising his twin children Amira and Shahzad. Tray decides to become a better man and a father with the help of the owner of a halfway house, Mullins, and his cousin Bobby.

Cast and characters

Main
 Tracy Morgan as Tray Leviticus Barker
 Tiffany Haddish as Shannon "Shay-Shay" Birkeland (seasons 1–3)
 Allen Maldonado as Robert "Bobby" Barker (seasons 1–3)
 Maldonado also plays Clyde Barker, Bobby's deceased older brother
 Ryan Gaul as Josh Birkeland
 Taylor Christian Mosby as Amira Birkeland
 Dante Hoagland as Shahzad Birkeland
 Cedric the Entertainer as Miniard Mullins (main season 1, recurring season 2–3)
 Anna Maria Horsford as Roberta (recurring seasons 1–3, main season 4)
 Da'Vine Joy Randolph as Veesy (season 4)

Recurring
 Joel Marsh Garland as Erwin "Big Country"
 J. B. Smoove as Carl
 Gino Vento as Gustavo
 Derek Gaines as Jason "Jaybird" Watkins
 Daniel J. Watts as Felony
 Dimitri Joseph Moise as Mostel Defferies
 Malik Yoba as Wavy
 Edi Patterson as Elizabeth
 Miles G. Jackson as Benjamin
 Natalie Carter as Ruth
 Byrne Davis, Jr. as Billy C.
 Randy Gambill as Jason
 Bresha Webb as Faith
 Method Man as Green-Eyes
 Cassandra Freeman as Jasmine
 Lord Jamar as Divine
 Giovanni Figueroa as Javi

Guest
 Beverly Sade as Angel 
 Jon J. Masters as Mr. Washington
 Judith Roberts as Mrs. Washington
 Chrissy Metz as Pooh Cat
 Thomas Jefferson Byrd as Jimmy
 Ebony Jo-Ann as Aunt Mercedes
 Luenell as Aunt Elaine
 Katt Williams as Fred
 Mike Tyson as Triple O.G
 Gary Dourdan as Bricks
 Teddy Atlas as himself
 Mark Breland as himself

Episodes

Series overview

Season 1 (2018)

Season 2 (2019)

Season 3 (2020)

Season 4 (2021)

Production

Development
On January 16, 2016, it was announced that FX had given the production a pilot order. The episode was written by Jordan Peele and John Carcieri. Executive producers were set to include Peele, Carcieri, Tracy Morgan, Eric Tannenbaum, and Joel Zadak. Production companies involved with the pilot included FX Productions.

On October 17, 2016, it was announced that series was moving from FX to TBS and that it had been given a series order for a first season consisting of ten episodes. The previous month, FX decided not to proceed with the production and its producers began to shop it around. Various networks showed interest but it ultimately came down to TBS and Comedy Central. The existing pilot script was rewritten and Studio T became involved in the series' production replacing FX Productions.

On May 17, 2017, it was announced that the series had been titled The Last O.G. On July 27, 2017, it was announced that series would premiere on October 24, 2017 with two episodes airing for a full hour. However, on January 11, 2018, it was announced that series would premiere on April 3, 2018. The premiere had been delayed after the departure of series co-creator and showrunner John Carcieri, who left after production on season one had ended. He was replaced by Saladin K. Patterson. On April 23, 2018, it was announced that the series had been renewed for a second season. On January 16, 2019, it was announced that the second season would premiere on April 2, 2019. On May 15, 2019, the series was renewed for a third season which premiered on April 7, 2020. On October 15, 2020, TBS renewed the series for a fourth season which premiered on October 26, 2021. In April 2022, it was revealed that the fourth season was the final season, the final episode having aired on December 21, 2021.

Casting
Alongside the initial pilot announcement, it was confirmed that Tracy Morgan would star in the series. On March 15, 2017, it was announced that Allen Maldonado had been cast as series regular. On April 13, 2017, it was reported that Ryan Gaul was joining the main cast. In May 2017, it was announced that Tiffany Haddish, Cedric the Entertainer, Taylor Mosby, and Dante Hoagland were joining the show as series regulars.

Release

Marketing
On February 16, 2018, TBS released the first trailer for the series. On January 16, 2019, a trailer for season two was released.

Premiere
On March 12, 2018, the series held its world premiere at the annual South by Southwest Film Festival in Austin, Texas at the Paramount Theatre. Following the screening, journalist Ramin Setoodeh moderated a question-and-answer session with Jorma Taccone, Tracy Morgan, and Tiffany Haddish.

Reception

Critical response
The series was met with a positive response from critics upon its premiere. On review aggregation website Rotten Tomatoes, the series holds an approval rating of 82% with an average rating of 7.47 out of 10 based on 34 reviews. The website's critical consensus reads, "Despite uneven writing, The Last O.G. succeeds on the strength of Tracy Morgan's inspired performance and Tiffany Haddish's comic instincts." On Metacritic it has a weighted average score of 65 out of 100 based on 18 reviews, indicating "generally favorable reviews."

Ratings
On April 3, 2018, the official series premiere drew 1.8 million total viewers, with 882K in the key 18-49 demo in Live + same day. This was the largest cable comedy premiere since 2016, the largest scripted cable comedy premiere since 2015, and the strongest TBS original debut ever. In addition, more than 6.9 million total viewers tuned into the show over a three-night, five-telecast launch on TBS and TNT following the NCAA Men's Basketball Final Four.

Awards and nominations

Notes

References

External links
 

2010s American black sitcoms
2020s American black sitcoms
2018 American television series debuts
2021 American television series endings
English-language television shows
TBS (American TV channel) original programming
Television series by Studio T
Television shows set in Brooklyn
Television series created by Jordan Peele
Works about gentrification